Greg Doyle (born 24 September 1970) is a former Australian rules footballer who played with St Kilda and Melbourne  in the Australian Football League (AFL).

A Springvale recruit, Doyle played two senior games for St Kilda in 1990. The following year he was a member of Dandenong's VFA premiership team. He returned to the AFL via the 1992 Mid-Season Draft, selected at pick two by Melbourne. In 1993 he played in a reserves premiership but was selected more regularly in 1994, making 13 appearances. He played seven games in each of the next two seasons. He returned to the VFA/VFL in 1997 for Traralgon, winning the best and fairest that year.

Doyle was appointed head coach of Rye in 2000 and also spent time Traralgon as an assistant. He served as assistant coach of TAC Cup team the Oakleigh Chargers from 2005 to 2008 and then worked with Vic Metro as an assistant coach, in 2009 and 2010.

References

1970 births
Australian rules footballers from Victoria (Australia)
St Kilda Football Club players
Melbourne Football Club players
Dandenong Football Club players
Traralgon Football Club players
Casey Demons players
Living people